Onuma, Ōnuma or Oonuma (written: 大沼 lit. "big swamp", おおぬま in hiragana) is a Japanese surname. Notable people with the surname include:

, Japanese volleyball player
, Japanese baseball player
, Japanese animation and theatre director

Onuma (written: 小沼 lit. "small swamp", おぬま in hiragana) is a separate Japanese surname, though both may be transliterated the same way. Notable people with the surname include:

, Japanese writer

Japanese-language surnames